William James Patterson  (25 September 1930 – 6 April 2002) was an Anglican priest.

He was born on 25 September 1930, educated at Haileybury and Balliol College, Oxford and ordained in 1955. After a curacy at St John Baptist, Newcastle upon Tyne he was Priest in Charge of Rio Claro with Mayaro in Trinidad. On his return to England he was Rector of Esher and then Little Downham. From 1979 to 1984 he was Archdeacon of Wisbech when he became  Dean of Ely, a post he held for six years. The cathedral itself was in urgent need of repair, and Patterson launched an appeal for £4 million. He was Vicar of Abbotsley until 1993. He died on 6 April 2002.

References

1930 births
People educated at Haileybury and Imperial Service College
Alumni of Balliol College, Oxford
Archdeacons of Wisbech
Deans of Ely
Commanders of the Order of the British Empire
2002 deaths